Kingsway Business Park is a  business park in the Metropolitan Borough of Rochdale, in Greater Manchester, England.

JD Sports and Wincanton for ASDA have warehouses on the site. Kingsway Village, a part of the business park, is a planned housing estate between a nature reserve and range of office buildings and commercial premises.

Kingsway Business Park Metrolink station is a light rail stop on the northeastern side of the site.

References

External links

Business parks of England
Economy of Greater Manchester
Year of establishment missing
Areas of the Metropolitan Borough of Rochdale